Don Gregorio Antón is a photographer and an Emeritus Professor of Art of Humboldt State University (HSU). During his 50-year vocation he has spoken nationally at universities and intercity schools in an effort to inspire and encourage students to realize their personal vision.

Early life and studies
Antón was born in East Los Angeles and raised in Pico Rivera, California. When he was 17, his father forbade him from following a career in photography unless Antón could prove to his father that a Chicano photographer could be successful. Antón searched libraries and found a book by influential Mexican photographer Manuel Álvarez Bravo, which proved to be sufficient for Antón's father.

Antón attended Rio Hondo College then shifted to San Francisco State University where he received his Bachelor of Arts in 1978 and a Master of Arts in 1980. He was mentored by photographers Duane Michals, Eikoh Hosoe, Brett Weston, Robert Heinecken, Edmund Teske, Don Worth, Jack Welpott, and, during his earliest years, with Dody Weston Thompson.

Teaching
Antón's first teaching assignment was on the campus of Otis Art Institute/Parsons School of Design, Los Angeles in 1983. In 1986, he became the Coordinator of Photographic Education through the department of Extended Education and served as curator of the college's gallery. He also taught evening courses at Chaffey College in Alta Loma.

In 1987, the founder of the photography program at Humboldt State University (HSU), Tom Knight, recruited Antón to fill a one-year visiting lecturer position. Antón was asked to stay for an additional year.

From 1989 to 1991, Antón served as director of the photography program at Olympic College in Bremerton. When Knight died, Antón was hired by HSU to fill his position. During Antón's tenure, he mentored the multicultural students. Antón retired in 2014.

Antón was awarded the Freestyle Crystal Apple Teaching Award in 2010 from the Society for Photographic Education, as well as the Excellence in Photographic Education – Teacher of the Year Award from the Santa Fe Center for Visual Arts in 2002. He has also received recognition from the WESTAF/National Endowment for the Arts, Regional Fellowship for the Visual Arts in 1993, and support from the Lorser Feitelson / Helen Lundeberg Grant in 1984.

Recognition
Antón's earliest contributions were recognized by Franciscan Sister Karen Boccalero, the director and founder of Self-Help Graphics, who curated his first exhibition at Galería Otra Vez in Boyle Heights in 1982. The exhibition and lecture was titled, Milagros and was reviewed by the writer and poet Dinah Berland of the Los Angeles Times who wrote, "Listening to Don Antón speak about his life is like reading Carlos Castaneda. Antón, an intense young artist with an acceptance of the magical in everyday experience, describes his photography as 'trying to balance on a tight wire between feeling and thought.' Antón's work, like his life, is guided by a quality of feeling." Councilwoman Gloria Molina awarded Antón a commendation from the city of Los Angeles for his efforts to inspire others within the Latino community.

Antón's work would also be included in the first cross-cultural exhibition of photography in Los Angeles. The Multicultural Focus survey was directed by the curator and writer, Josine Ianco-Starrels and held at the Los Angeles Municipal Art Gallery in Barnsdall Park in 1981 to celebrate the cities Bicentennial. American journalist Suzanne Muchnic called it "The best contemporary show [of photography] of the year". Thirty years later, this exhibition, retitled REFOCUS: Multicultural Focus, would resurface through the efforts of the photographer and educator Sheila Pinkel, and presented in the Getty Museum's monumental survey Pacific Standard Time. It was a major collaboration of over 60 cultural institutions across Southern California, coming together for six months, from October 2011 to March 2012, to tell the story of the birth of the Los Angeles art scene and how it became a major force in the art world.

Antón was selected to participate in the exhibition, American Voices: Latino Photography in the U.S., created by FotoFest's artistic director, Wendy Watriss, and presented at the Smithsonian's Ripley International Gallery in 1997.

In 2001, Plaza de la Raza included Antón's imagery in their touring presentation of Hecho en Califas: The Last Decade. This exhibition was curated by the artist and educator Richard Lou and coordinated by Rebecca Nevarez. In the accompanying catalog, Lou's essay, "The Secularization of the Chicano Visual Idiom: Diversifying the Iconography", Antón is quoted, "Art for me are the things that were kept next to your Santos in your house, they were the pictures that meant the most; the galleries that are the most significant are the ones that we keep in our back pockets."

A major retrospective of his work, entitled The Total Sum of Solitudes: Thirty Years of Photography by Don Gregorio Antón, was presented at HSU's First Street Gallery in 2004. Accompanying this exhibition was a survey of Antón's former and current students titled, From Whom I’ve Studied, From Whom I’ve Learned. In the corresponding brochure, intern Cyrus Smith wrote, "These pieces, as in all of Antón's work in photography and in teaching, are, above all, gifts. They bring the gift of opportunity. He does not offer you what to learn, but rather how to learn. He does not simply show you a photograph, he allows you to enter into it. In doing so, Don Antón's photographs offer us the opportunity to see the richness and undeniable power of hope."

In 2006, Antón's Artist-in-residence at Light Work would lead to the exhibition and catalog Ollin Mecatl: The Measure of Movements, curated and authored by the Executive Director and photographer Hannah Freiser. Fine Arts Critic and former Director of the Michael C. Rockefeller Arts Center, Katherine Rushworth described it as "One of the most elegant shows of the year". The show contained Antón's "Retablos" series, intimate images on copper plates that harken to religious iconography often found in colonial churches. This style of devotional paintings were first experienced by Antón when he was an altar boy at Saint Francis Xavier church in Pico Rivera.

In Light Work's Annual Contact Sheet of 2007, the poet and photo-historian John Wood wrote, "Don Gregorio Antón's photographs radiate compassion like the work of no other living artist I know. They are filled with an intense humanity we usually find only in a few documentary photographers and photo-journalists—the Smiths, Salgados, and Nachtweys. Antón is, however, a different kind of photographer, though one could call his work a document of the spirit, the journal of a sacred quest. But his photographs are not even photographs in the usual sense of the word—those captured moments of a past reality, be they taken by someone's uncle at a family picnic or by Paul Strand in a French village. His images, though equally real, are constructions of psychological realities, portrayals of mythic fears, sacrifices, and hopes... In the presence of such art we are in the presence of the sacred." In 2010, Aperture exhibited a selection of this work in Mexico & Afuera: Contemporary Mexican and Mexican-American Voices, and Selections from En Foco featuring Chicano, Mexican and Mexican American photographers.

Antón's work was shown in EN FOCO: New Works/Crossing Boundaries, a collaborative exhibition by the editor and publisher, Miriam Romais and the historian and director of BRIC ARTS, Elizabeth Ferrer, in 2013. Ferrer wrote of this exhibition in the photographic journal Nueva Luz, "For the series included in the exhibition, Arc of Tragedy, Antón placed photographs into reliquaries, shrine-like objects created to house religious artifacts (or literally, relics) such as the fragment of a saints’s bone or clothing. Antón’s reliquaries display small photographs, often self-portraits depicting some kind of ritual act or moment of ecstasy. There is an otherworldly quality to these images; they are primal and visceral, yet suffused with shadows and never fully comprehensible. The artist’s aim is not to provide fixed meanings or readings, but for the viewer to complete these works, to project their own memories, dreams, or emotions upon the imagery and to continue this unending project of the search for self."

Writings

Antón was awarded the Cesar Chavez Award from the students of M.E.Ch.A. (Movimiento Estudiantil Chicano de Aztlan) of HSU, for their use of his essay "No Thought is Alone – A Teachers Plea for You to Add Yourself into the Course of Change" in welcoming and retaining incoming "diverse" students to the university.

In a plea to clarify those issues related to a personal inclusivity of ones own reflective thought, Antón's essay published by the Hispanic Research Center's Latina/o Art Community asserts, "It is crucial to understand that you must add a part of yourself to all that you see for learning to take place. Learning, not in what you see, but in how you see. Whatever you approach, whatever mysteries there are, all of them will need you as a vital pat of their unfolding. So I ask you to be active with your thoughts, challenge your world, refine your seeing as this is a gift you can only give yourself."

"Of Fields and Fissures: Facing Diversity and Leveling the Playing Field", was published in Nueva Luz (Vol.14 No.2), and its accompanying lecture "It Is Not in What You Teach, but Who You Teach", was presented at the 2010 Society of Photographic Education National Conference in Philadelphia.

Interviews

In the conversation, "Interviewing Don Gregorio Antón About Learning Through The Lens" for the Huffington Post, Ramon Nuez describes Antón's process of seeing, "There is a mysticism in Antón's work. Which calls for a preoccupation of thought. Provoking a different response in every viewer."

Antón was featured on "What Follows" a video production of the University of Colorado, Boulder, which is an ongoing series of videotaped interviews with artists, critics and curators who have participated in the Visiting Artist Program of the Department of Art & Art History. What Follows provides an accessible and inexpensive opportunity for colleges, schools and museums to become aware of the individuals currently active in today's art world.

Antón was also highlighted in Blue Mitchell's Diffusion: Unconventional Photography Vol. 2. In the Artist Profile entitled "The Rules of Tragedy", Antón claims, "To believe in anything is to risk the chance of being misunderstood... If you are willing to give up the weight of failure and judgment in your work, you will allow it freedom to move at its own velocity in its own unique force of description. Then it will have something to teach you, something to make use of what you know."

Aesthetics

Essayist Cameron Woodall, addresses the works relative nature of empathy, "Using Photography, Don Gregorio Antón searches the depths of consciousness leaving us awed at magic manifested. Charged with spiritual energy, his art is utilized to seek understanding of himself and his world. Through his use of personal myth we find the connection between subjective knowledge and shared emotion. The final pieces are neither questions nor answers but are artifacts of memory and experience."

The photography critic Paul La Rosa, construes the emotional underpinnings of the imagery, "To view the widely praised and widely exhibited work of Don Gregorio Antón is to bear witness to an intensely personal vision, immersive and in-the-raw. It seems more compelled than devised, conjuring a world both strange and familiar, enclosed and internal yet reverberating outward. We are riveted by these photographs as we might suddenly catch a stranger in a moment of self-reflection, caressing an exposed limb or talking out loud or shedding a tear alone in public. In times like these, we glimpse ourselves in others, acknowledge common pains and desires and fugitive thoughts. This is the hidden, introspective terrain Antón explores and records, and in which we in turn, halt, and find ourselves reflected."

Hannah Frieser's introduction to "OLLIN MECATL: The Measure of Movements", interprets the works ancestral construct, "Antón’s work is likely to provoke a different response in every viewer. The retablos can be appreciated for their enigmatic beauty, their haunting narratives, or their intense spirituality. Where we find ourselves in our lives may be where we find ourselves in Antón’s imagery, so it is up to each person to find his or her own way to his world. Antón has tightly woven his cultural identity into this body of work. Through the imagery and text of each retablo he describes and reforges his connectedness to his roots in Mexico. The writing on some retablos is easy to read, while the words on others fade into the background like melodies half remembered. Not unlike diary entries, the writing is deeply personal and vulnerable to exposure. The work describes a mysterious and otherworldly existence that most of us experience only through dreams or nightmares. Linear time does not exist, and raw emotions are laid out in the open. Antón’s world is not defined as pain and suffering, though both appear frequently in the images. Rather suffering, pain, and fear are invited and accepted as players within the timeless cycle of life, along with bliss and salvation."

Exhibits

His works have been exhibited at Aperture in New York; the Royal Photographic Society, Bath, England; Museum of Photographic Arts, San Diego; Nagase Photo Salon, Tokyo and Osaka; El Museo Francisco Oller y Diego Rivera, Buffalo, NY; Friends of Photography, Carmel, CA; Art Museum of the Americas, Washington, DC; Aljira, a Center for Contemporary Art, Newark, NJ; Bronx Museum of the Arts, NY; Sol Mednick Gallery, Philadelphia, PA; Starlight Gallery, Brooklyn, NY; Longwood Art Gallery, Bronx, NY; Arts Visalia Visual Arts Center, Visalia, CA; and at the Getty Museum's "Pacific Standard Time", REFOCUS: Multicultural Focus, and at Santa Monica Art Studios (SMAS) in California.

His work has been published in "Don Gregorio Antón – Ollin Mecatl: The Measure of Movements", Contact Sheet No. 145; "Strange Genius": 21st The Journal of Contemporary Photography Vol. 5"; as well as Contemporary Chicana and Chicano Art – Artists, Works Culture, and Education Vol. 1.

Publications
 2020: Latinx Photography in the United States, by Elizabeth Ferrer 
 2008: Contact Sheet, "Don Gregorio Antón – Ollin Mecatl: The Measure of Movements", introduction by Hannah Frieser 
 2002: Contemporary Chicana and Chicano Art: Artists, Work, Culture, and Education, by Gary D. Keller 
 2001: "Strange Genius" – The Journal of Contemporary Photography, Volume V, by Leo & Wolfe Photography

Videos
 2010: No Thought is Alone, YouTube. (Video, 10-minute edited version.)
2008: WHAT FOLLOWS, YouTube. (Video, 8:31 minutes.)
 2006: Light Work – "Spotlight on Photography", Don Gregorio Antón (Video, 8:57 minutes.)

References

External links

Lightwork profile

Fine art photographers
Photography academics
Hispanic and Latino American artists
American artists of Mexican descent
American surrealist artists
Photographers from California
Artists from Los Angeles
20th-century American photographers
21st-century American photographers
American art educators
American contemporary artists
Living people
1956 births